Cetacea is an infraorder that comprises the 94 species of whales, dolphins, and porpoises. It is divided into toothed whales (Odontoceti) and baleen whales (Mysticeti), which diverged from each other in the Eocene some 50 million years ago (mya). Cetaceans are descended from land-dwelling hoofed mammals, and the now extinct archaeocetes represent the several transitional phases from terrestrial to completely aquatic. Historically, cetaceans were thought to have descended from the wolf-like mesonychids, but cladistic analyses confirm their placement with even-toed ungulates in the order Cetartiodactyla.

Whale populations were drastically reduced in the 20th century from intensive whaling, and the activity was globally banned in 1982. Smaller cetaceans are at risk of accidentally getting caught by fishing vessels using, namely, seine fishing, drift netting, or gill netting operations.

Conventions 

The following is a list of currently existing (or, in the jargon of taxonomy) 'extant' species of the infraorder cetacea (for extinct cetacean species, see the list of extinct cetaceans). The list is organized taxonomically into parvorders, superfamilies when applicable, families, subfamilies when applicable, genus, and then species. In tabular form, seven descriptors are given for each species: the common name; the scientific name; the IUCN Red List status; a global population estimate; a global map with its range; its weight with an image of its shape, and its size relative to a human; and a photograph.

Conservation status codes listed follow the IUCN Red List of Threatened Species (v. 2014.3; data current at 20 January 2015).

Where available, the global population estimate has been listed. When not cited or footnoted differently, these are from the IUCN Red List of Threatened Species (v. 2014.3; data current at 20 January 2015).

Mysticeti: baleen whales 

The baleen whales, also called whalebone whales or great whales, form the parvorder Mysticeti. Baleen whales are characterized by having baleen plates for filter feeding and two blowholes.

Family Balaenidae: right whales 

The family Balaenidae, the right whales, contains two genera and four species. All right whales have no ventral grooves; a distinctive head shape with a strongly arched, narrow rostrum, bowed lower jaw; lower lips that enfold the sides and front of the rostrum; and long, narrow, elastic baleen plates (up to nine times longer than wide) with fine baleen fringes.

</onlyinclude>

Family Balaenopteridae: rorquals 

Rorquals are the largest group of baleen whales, with eleven species in three genera. They include the largest animal that has ever lived, the blue whale. They take their name from a Norwegian word meaning "furrow whale"; all members of the family have a series of longitudinal folds of skin running from below the mouth back to the navel (except the sei whale, which has shorter grooves). They allow the mouth to expand immensely when feeding. All rorquals have these unique folds.

Family Cetotheriidae: pygmy right whale 

The pygmy right whale shares several characteristics with the right whales, with the exception of having a dorsal fin. Also, pygmy right whales' heads are no more than one-fourth the size of their bodies, whereas the right whales' heads are about one-third the size of their bodies. The pygmy right whale is the only extant member of its family.

Odontoceti: toothed whales 

The toothed whales (parvorder Odontoceti), as the name suggests, are characterized by having teeth (rather than baleen). Toothed whales are active hunters, feeding on fish, squid, and in some cases other marine mammals.

Family Delphinidae: oceanic dolphins 

Oceanic dolphins are the members of the family Delphinidae. As the name implies, they tend to be found in the open seas, unlike the river dolphins, although a few species such as the Irrawaddy dolphin are coastal or riverine.

The Delphinidae are characterized by having distinct beaks (unlike the Phocoenidae), two or more fused cervical vertebrae and 20 or more pairs of teeth in their upper jaws. None is more than 4 m long.

Family Iniidae: river dolphins 

This family contains one genus with two species.

Family Kogiidae: dwarf and pygmy sperm whales 

The dwarf and pygmy sperm whales resemble sperm whales, but are far smaller. They have blunt, squarish heads with narrow, underslung jaws; the flippers are set far forward, close to the head and their dorsal fins are set far back down the body.

Family Lipotidae: baiji 

The family Lipotidae contains only the baiji. DNA evidence suggests it separated from oceanic dolphins about 25 million years ago. The species was declared functionally extinct in 2006 after an expedition to estimate the population found none.

Family Monodontidae: narwhal and beluga 

The Monodontidae lack dorsal fins, which have been replaced by tough, fibrous ridges just behind the midpoints of their bodies and are probably an adaptation to swimming under ice, as both do in their Arctic habitat. The flippers are small, rounded and tend to curl up at the ends in adulthood. All, or almost all, the cervical vertebrae are unfused, allowing their heads to be turned independently of their bodies.

Family Phocoenidae: porpoises 

Porpoises are small cetaceans of the family Phocoenidae. They are distinct from dolphins, although the word "porpoise" has been used to refer to any small dolphin, especially by sailors and fishermen. The most obvious visible differences between the two groups are that porpoises have a less pronounced beak, and have spade-shaped teeth as opposed to conical.

Porpoises, divided into seven species, live in all oceans. They span from species that live almost exclusively coastal and in rivers (finless porpoises) to species that are entirely oceanic (spectacled porpoise).

Family Physeteridae: sperm whale 

The sperm whale characteristically has a large, squarish head one-third the length of its body; the blowhole is slightly to the left hand side; the skin is usually wrinkled; and it has no teeth on the upper jaw.

Family Platanistidae: South Asian river dolphins 

The Platanistidae were originally thought to hold only one species (the South Asian river dolphin), but, based on differences in skull structure, vertebrae and lipid composition, it was split into two separate species in the early 1970s, before being demoted back to subspecies in 1988. However, more recent studies support them being distinct species.

Family Pontoporiidae: La Plata dolphin 

The La Plata dolphin is the only species of the family Pontoporiidae and genus Pontoporia. These dolphins are known for their long beak in relation to their relatively small body size. They have a small geographic range and are mainly found in the waters along the east coast of South America. La Plata dolphins are exclusively marine organisms, however, they are grouped with river-dolphins due to the fact that they reside in the La Plata River which is a salt-water estuary. With their white or sometimes pale brown coloration, fishermen tend to call them "the white ghost", as they also tend to stray away from any human interaction.

Family Ziphiidae: beaked whales 

A beaked whale is any of at least 22 species of whale in the family Ziphiidae. Several species have only been described in the last two decades. Six genera have been identified.

They possess a unique feeding mechanism among cetaceans known as suction feeding. They are characterized by having a lower jaw that extends at least to the tip of the upper jaw, a shallow or non-existent notch between the tail flukes, a dorsal fin set far backwards, three of four fused neck vertebrae, extensive skull asymmetry and two conspicuous throat grooves forming a 'V' pattern (which aid in sucking).

See also 

 List of cetacean genera
 List of extinct cetaceans
 List of individual cetaceans
 Evolution of cetaceans
 Archaeoceti
 List of whale vocalizations
 List of marine mammal species
 Mammal classification

Footnotes

References

Further reading 

 
 
 
 Carwardine, M., Whales, Dolphins and Porpoises, Dorling Kindersley, 2000. .

External links 

 CMS Small Cetaceans

Cetacea

Cetaceans